Swetnam is a surname.

People with the name include:

 Huw Swetnam, British slalom canoeist
 Joseph Swetnam (died 1621), English pamphleteer and fencing master
 Thomas W. Swetnam (born 1955), American dendrochronologist

See also 
 Swetnam the Woman-Hater, a Jacobean era stage play